Porter Township is a township in Jefferson County, Pennsylvania, United States. The population was 292 at the 2020 census.

Porter Township was organized in 1840, and was named for Governor of Pennsylvania David R. Porter.

Geography
The township occupies the southwestern corner of Jefferson County, bordered to the south by Indiana County and to the west by Armstrong County. The borough of Timblin borders the western part of the northern edge of the township. Unincorporated communities in the township include Porter and Corbettown.

Demographics

As of the census of 2000, there were 282 people, 110 households, and 85 families residing in the township.  The population density was 15.9 people per square mile (6.1/km).  There were 137 housing units at an average density of 7.7/sq mi (3.0/km).  The racial makeup of the township was 100.00% White.

There were 110 households, out of which 27.3% had children under the age of 18 living with them, 60.9% were married couples living together, 8.2% had a female householder with no husband present, and 22.7% were non-families. 16.4% of all households were made up of individuals, and 7.3% had someone living alone who was 65 years of age or older.  The average household size was 2.56 and the average family size was 2.85.

In the township the population was spread out, with 24.1% under the age of 18, 7.1% from 18 to 24, 26.2% from 25 to 44, 24.8% from 45 to 64, and 17.7% who were 65 years of age or older.  The median age was 39 years. For every 100 females, there were 94.5 males.  For every 100 females age 18 and over, there were 96.3 males.

The median income for a household in the township was $28,214, and the median income for a family was $29,500. Males had a median income of $28,393 versus $16,250 for females. The per capita income for the township was $12,800.  About 7.7% of families and 17.5% of the population were below the poverty line, including 40.8% of those under the age of 18 and 14.3% of those 65 or over.

References

Townships in Jefferson County, Pennsylvania
Townships in Pennsylvania